Dzhida is a  former military air base of the Russian Air Force in Dzhidinsky District, Buryatia, Russia. It was located in the town of Dzhida, and featured a large fighter base with small revetment groups scattered around the airfield.

Dzhida has been home to:
 2 Gv BAP (2nd Guards Bomber Aviation Regiment) flying Sukhoi Su-24M aircraft (1969 - 2010).
 21 BAP (21st Bomber Aviation Regiment) flying Su-24 (1969 - 1983).
 
The airfield's name has sometimes erroneously appeared as Eleagnus, the Russian form of the Latin name for the plant Elaeagnus, known as dzhida in Russian. The name Dzhida is not derived from the Elaeagnus plant, but from the Buryat language term ƶede, meaning copper.

References

Soviet Air Force bases
Soviet Frontal Aviation
Russian Air Force bases